Manuel Zorrilla de la Torre (26 April 1919 – 12 May 2015) was an Argentinian painter, illustrator, engraver, drawer, and sculptor. His parents were Spanish immigrants.

Career 
Zorrilla was born in Buenos Aires in 1919.

From his childhood, he takes delight in painting the rural world which surrounds him. The fauna (horses) and the flora (fruit trees, flowers) are inexhaustible sources of inspiration. In 1942, he exposed for the first time together with other artists: critic noticed and greeted him as a young hope for the Fine Art. This year marked the beginning of exhibitions, greeted by the press, which remained continuous until 1980.

From 1949 until 1953, he received numerous prices like the " Watercolorists and Engravers Society price ", the " National Show of Drawing and Engraving price", the " Fine Art Society of Santa Fe price", the " Fine Art Society of Rosario price" and the " Fine Art Society of Mar del Plata price". In 1954 he was elected vice-president of the Argentine Society of the Plastic Arts.

Tireless traveler in Latin America and in Europe, he was interested in the landscapes and the human being in his environment. His work tells the life: in the harvests, to the factory, the "cariocas" from Rio de Janeiro (exposed at the Art museum of São Paulo in Brazil), Indians of the Argentine northwest, the tango in Buenos Aires, the forest in Venezuela but also Paris and the Seine, Rome and its monuments, Venice and Spain. The women is also a subject declined in plenty of "figures". His works of composition are numerous like: " The seat of Numance", " The ground universe and his populations” and the series " The sea " and “The Big River”.

In 1982, he came to settle down in France, to Fontenay Fleury (Yvelines), among which the old village and its fields were sources of inspiration. He also began writing poetry and did several works where he often took back the subjects developed in his pictorial work. He died in 2015 in Fontenay-le-Fleury, France.

Early years 

Eminently self-taught, his academy is the life in all its appearances.  Since 1935 he has worked with graphic and advertising studios. Quickly he turns towards The Argentine Plastic Artists Society and to The Circle of Fine Art, in Buenos Aires, to draw the nude. It is in the Zoo, in the Botanical garden, in Agricultural show and in the parks of Buenos Aires where he found his models to draw the nature. In the Circle of Fine Art the sculptor Arturo Dresco offered him his first clay to model. But the meeting with Alcides Gubellini, Italian painter and sculptor, turned out to be determining. Advice on his drawings he lavished and later introduction into the oil painting, guided his first steps. He considers Gubellini as his true master.

Exhibitions 

Manuel Zorrilla made a lot of individual exhibitions in Argentina on Wildenstein, Witcomb, Peuser, Müller, Perla Marino, El Nauta galleries; in Brasil, on Ibeu Gallery, Fine Arts Museum of São Paulo; in France, on Marcel Bernheim Gallery, Theâtre de Fontenay le Fleury.
He also participated on various collective exhibitions : "Obras de 30 pintores argentinos" Kraft (1951),  "Caballos" Wildenstein (1960), "Pintura argentina" Gran Teatro Opera (1965), "Exposicion del grabado" Casa América(1965), "Muestra de pintores argentinos" Perla Marino y Club Atlético River Plate, "Motivos de tango" Ateneo Popular de la Boca (1974), "Muestra colectiva de Marinas" El Nauta (1975), "Maestros Argentinos del Dibujo" América (1975), Carroussel du Louvre Paris (2001), and as "invité d'honneur" of "Couleurs et Passion 2004" Exhibition in Cheptainville (2004) France.

Prizes and awards

Prizes

Awards 

In 1954, Manuel Zorrilla was named Vice President of Argentina Society of Plastics Arts.
In 1974, Manuel Zorrilla received the Gold Medal of Llave Mohosa n°199 by the painter Esteban Semino.
On 5 October 1974, he received the Gold Award of "Ateneo Popular de la Boca" given by the Conseiller Victor C. Pereira

Technics developed 

Oil Painting on toile, wood and cartouline paper. 
Pastel, oil pastel, charbon, crayon. 
Drawing, china ink, colors ink, he developed a personal technic : acuarela ink. 
Fresco and ceramic painting. 
Lithography monochrome and color. 
Serigraphy.
Terra cota Sculpture.

External links 

  m1.htm reference on the website arte argentino
  Contemporany Art Museum of National University of Litoral – Argentina
  Painting "Figura" from the Contemporany Art Museum of the National University of Litoral in Argentina
  
  Website of Manuel Zorrilla association

Bibliography 

 Interview from RIO magazine, Rio de Janeiro, Brasil, June 1952
 TV interview on Canal 7, émission IMAGENES PLASTICAS, 1953
 Interview from PROPAGANDA magazine, article "Manuel Zorrilla. Pintor, ilustrador, maestro de un nuevo motivo de plastica", October 1954
 Interview from DIBUJANTES magazine, article "La publicidad ha ganado un artista de extraordinaria sensibilidad", Mars 1957
 Radio interview "Arte y musica" from Radio municipal de Buenos Aires, September 1971
 Reportage by Radio El Mundo dans l'émission "Argentina Cultural" by Carlos Arturo Orfeo the 5 August 1964
 Discussion with José de España at the Galeria Gran Teatro Opera exhibition in August 1964
 Discussion with José de España at the Galeria Reguan Exhibition in September 1974
 Article from Habitat 8 magazine (1952) from Fran Martins (Arts museum of São Paulo exhibition – Brazil)

References

1919 births
2015 deaths
Argentine muralists
Argentine painters
Argentine male painters
Argentine sculptors
Male sculptors
Artists from Buenos Aires
Argentine expatriates in France